Jessica may refer to:

Given name 

 Jessica (given name), includes a list of people and fictional characters with this name
 Jessica Folcker, a Swedish singer known by the mononym Jessica
 Jessica Jung, a Korean-American singer known by the mononym Jessica, former member of the South Korean girl group Girls' Generation
Jessica (The Merchant of Venice), a character in Shakespeare's play

Animals
 Jessica (spider), a genus of spiders
 Catocala jessica, a moth of the Noctuidae superfamily, described from Arizona through Colorado to Illinois and California
 Perrona jessica, a species of sea snail, a marine gastropod mollusk in the family Clavatulidae

Arts, entertainment, and media

Music 
 Jessika (opera), 1905 opera by  Josef Bohuslav Foerster

Albums
Jessica (Gerald Wilson album), 1983
Jessica (sv), 1998 debut album by Swedish singer Jessica Folcker

Songs
 "Jessica" (instrumental), a 1973 song by the Allman Brothers Band
 "Jessica" (Elliot Minor song), a 2007 song by English band Elliot Minor
 "Jessica", a 2001 single by Dir En Grey from the album Kisō
 "Jessica", a song by Adam Green
 "Jessica", a song by Down with Webster
 "Jessica", a song by Herbie Hancock originally on the album Fat Albert Rotunda
 "Jessica", a song by Major Lazer featuring Ezra Koenig on the Major Lazer album Free the Universe
 "Jessica", a song by The Beau Brummels on the album Bradley's Barn
 "Jessica", a song by Seals and Crofts on the album Diamond Girl
 "Jessica", a song by Israeli band Ethnix and Yevgeni Shapovalov
 "Jessica", a song by Avi Buffalo on their self-titled debut album
 "Jessica", a song by Regina Spektor

Other uses in arts, entertainment, and media
 Jessica (film), a 1962 film with Maurice Chevalier and Angie Dickinson
 Jessica (miniseries), based on the 1998 novel
 Jessica (novel), by Bryce Courtenay 1998
 Jessica, a 2004 Australian film directed by Peter Andrikidis and starring Natasha Wanganeen
 Jessica (painting), an 1890 painting by Dennis Miller Bunker

Other uses 
 Joint European Support for Sustainable Investment in City Areas, an initiative of the European Investment Bank
 , an oil tanker that spilled 568 tons of oil off the coast of the Galapagos Islands

See also 
 Baby Jessica case, a well-publicized custody battle in Ann Arbor, Michigan in the early 1990s
 Jessica's Law, a Florida law to punish child predators
 Iscah, daughter of Haran in the Bible (Genesis 11:27, 29), speculated to be the source of the name 'Jessica'
 Jessicka (born 1975), American musician